Fortunago is a comune (municipality) in the Province of Pavia in the Italian region Lombardy, located about 91 km south of Milan and about 42 km south of Pavia. As of 31 December 2004, it had a population of 407 and an area of 18.0 km².

Fortunago borders the following municipalities: Borgo Priolo, Borgoratto Mormorolo, Montesegale, Ruino, Val di Nizza.

Fortunago was also the location for the film Human Capital by Italian filmmaker Paolo Virzì. Some of the scenes of the film were shot at the Villa "La Dominante", placed in Montebelletto, in the nearby of the village.

Demographic evolution

References

External links
 www.comunedifortunago.it

Cities and towns in Lombardy